Taraneh Records is a record label based in Reseda, California. The label focuses on Iranian music. Taraneh Enterprises, Inc. (dba: Taraneh Records) is a major manufacturer and distributor of Persian Media (DVD, CD, VHS) in the United States. Taraneh Enterprises, Inc. has a large selection of old and new Iranian music CDs and movies on DVDs.

Notable artists
Artists and bands who have recorded with Taraneh Enterprises, Inc include:

Andranik Madadian
Andy & Kouros
Aref Arefkia
Bijan Mortazavi
Black Cats
Dariush Eghbali
Delkash
Ebi
Emad Ahmadi
Emad Ram
Faramarz Aslani
Fereydoon Forooghi
Fereydoun Farrokhzad
Gholam-Hossein Banan
Hassan Sattar
Hayedeh
Homeyra
Leila Forouhar
Mansour
Martik
Marzieh
Maziar
Mahasti
Moein
Morteza Barjesteh
Omid Soltani
Pyruz
Pouya Jalili Pour
Shahram Shabpareh
Shahrum Kashani
Shohreh Solati
Siavash Ghomayshi
Siavash Shams
Susan Roshan
Viguen

See also
 List of record labels

References

External links 

 Taraneh Records official website
 

American record labels
Persian pop music
Persian music
Iranian record labels